The Interstate Packaging Arboretum is an arboretum located on the Interstate Packaging Company property, Highway 47 North, White Bluff, Tennessee.

The arboretum includes over 60 species of shrubs and trees, as well as a greenhouse and fish pond (25,000 square feet). It serves as a planting site for The American Chestnut Foundation.

See also 
 List of botanical gardens in the United States

External links
Interstate Packaging, About IP

Arboreta in Tennessee
Botanical gardens in Tennessee
Protected areas of Dickson County, Tennessee